Peter Eggert (born 8 June 1943 in Berlin) is a former German football player and manager.

Eggert played his entire career for Tennis Borussia Berlin, making a total of 57 professional appearances and scoring three goals. After his playing career he twice took over the managerial reins on an interim basis for the club.

References

External links 
 

1943 births
Living people
Footballers from Berlin
German footballers
Association football defenders
Bundesliga players
2. Bundesliga players
Tennis Borussia Berlin players
German football managers
Tennis Borussia Berlin managers